A round skate is a common name that is used for several different species of rays:

 The round skate, Rajella fyllae
 The Indonesian round skate, Rajella annandalei
 The Australian round skates, Irolita
 The southern round skate, Irolita waitii
 The western round skate, Irolita westraliensis
 The thornback guitarfish, Platyrhinoidis triseriata